Bristol is an unincorporated community in Harrison County, West Virginia, United States. Bristol had a post office, which closed on October 1, 2005.

The community was settled by Seventh Day Baptists in the 1790s and originally called Cherry Camp Run. The current name is a transfer from Bristol, England.

References

Unincorporated communities in Harrison County, West Virginia
Unincorporated communities in West Virginia